Peresheyechny is a rural locality (a settlement) in Lebyazhinsky Selsoviet, Yegoryevsky District, Altai Krai, Russia. The population was 639 as of 2013. There are 4 streets.

Geography 
Peresheyechny is located 9 km southwest of Novoyegoryevskoye (the district's administrative centre) by road. Lebyazhye is the nearest rural locality.

References 

Rural localities in Yegoryevsky District, Altai Krai